The 2007–08 Maryland Terrapins men's basketball team represented the University of Maryland in the 2007–08 college basketball season as a member of the Atlantic Coast Conference (ACC). The team was led by 19th-year head coach Gary Williams. Maryland finished with a 19–15 record, and did not qualify for the NCAA tournament. The Terrapins were eliminated in the second round of the National Invitation Tournament.

Roster

Schedule and results

|-
!colspan=9| CBE Classic

|-
!colspan=9| Regular season

|-
!colspan=9| ACC tournament

|- NIT, Second Round 
!colspan=9| National Invitation Tournament

See also
Maryland Terrapins men's basketball

Maryland Terrapins men's basketball seasons
Maryland
Maryland
Maryland
Maryland